A DNA disruptor may refer to:
A mutagen, an agent that causes genetic mutations
Any agent that causes DNA damage